A Fistful of Alice is a live album by American hard rock singer Alice Cooper. It was released on July 29, 1997, and was recorded the previous year at Sammy Hagar's Cabo Wabo club in Cabo San Lucas, Mexico. Slash plays guitar for part of the album (returning the favor after Cooper guested on "The Garden" from the 1991 Guns N' Roses album Use Your Illusion I) and Cooper says before the song "Desperado" that it was written about Jim Morrison, who died in 1971, the same year Cooper wrote the song. Also featured in the album are Rob Zombie on vocals and Sammy Hagar on guitar. The only song from the show that has not been commercially released is the title track from 1991's Hey Stoopid. The last song, "Is Anyone Home?", is a studio recording recorded specifically for the album.

Live At Cabo Wabo '96 is a 2005 re-packaged release of A Fistful of Alice, using the UK track listing (see below).

Track listing

US Track Listing

UK Track Listing

Japanese Track Listing

Australian Track Listing

Personnel
Alice Cooper – lead vocals
Reb Beach – guitar
Ryan Roxie – guitar
Todd Jensen – bass guitar
Paul Taylor – keyboards, guitar
Jimmy DeGrasso – drums
Additional personnel
Sammy Hagar – guitar
Slash – lead guitar
Rob Zombie – lead vocals

References

Alice Cooper live albums
1997 live albums